Ahmadabad-e Kalij-e Olya (also Romanized as Aḩmadābād-e Kalīj-e ‘Olyā; also known as Aḩmadābād-e Kalīch) is a village in Dabuy-ye Shomali Rural District, Sorkhrud District, Mahmudabad County, Mazandaran Province, Iran. At the 2006 census, its population was 435, in 126 families.

References 

Populated places in Mahmudabad County